Hugh Boyd Strachan (born 16 November 1962) was a Scottish footballer who played for Stranraer and Dumbarton.

References

1962 births
Scottish footballers
Dumbarton F.C. players
Stranraer F.C. players
Troon F.C. players
Scottish Football League players
Living people
Association football goalkeepers